Copulabyssia is a genus of sea snails, marine gastropod mollusks in the family Pseudococculinidae.

Species
Species within the genus Copulabyssia include:
 Copulabyssia colombia Ardila & Harasewych, 2005
 Copulabyssia gradata (B. A. Marshall, 1986) 
 Copulabyssia leptalea (A. E. Verrill, 1884)
 Copulabyssia riosi Leal & Simone, 2000
 Copulabyssia similaris Hasegawa, 1997
 Copulabyssia tenuis (Monterosato, 1880)
Species brought into synonymy
 Copulabyssia corrugata (Jeffreys, 1883): synonym of Copulabyssia tenuis (Monterosato, 1880)

References

 Haszprunar G. (1988). Anatomy and affinities of Pseudococculinid limpets (Mollusca, Archeogastropoda). Zoologica Scripta, 17(2): 161-179
 Gofas, S.; Le Renard, J.; Bouchet, P. (2001). Mollusca, in: Costello, M.J. et al. (Ed.) (2001). European register of marine species: a check-list of the marine species in Europe and a bibliography of guides to their identification. Collection Patrimoines Naturels, 50: pp. 180–213

External links

Pseudococculinidae